Wilhelm "Willi" Zacharias (7 March 1914 – 29 April 2006) was a Romanian male handball player, Nordic combined skier, and cross-country skier. He was a member of the Romania men's national handball team. He was a part of the  team at the 1936 Summer Olympics, playing two matches. On club level he played for Hermannstädter Turnverein in Romania. He also competed at the 1936 Winter Olympics.

References

1914 births
2006 deaths
Romanian male handball players
Romanian male cross-country skiers
Olympic handball players of Romania
Sportspeople from Sibiu
Olympic alpine skiers of Romania
Romanian male Nordic combined skiers
Field handball players at the 1936 Summer Olympics
Alpine skiers at the 1936 Winter Olympics
Olympic cross-country skiers of Norway
Cross-country skiers at the 1936 Winter Olympics